Bishop Creek is also a dated variant of Baxter Creek in Richmond/El Cerrito, California

Bishop Creek is a  stream in Inyo County, California. It is the largest tributary of the Owens River. It has five hydroelectric plants owned by Southern California Edison, Bishop Creek #2–6. Bishop Creek #1 was never completed. Parts of the creek run through pipelines, or penstocks, to increase output at the power plants.

Geography 
Bishop Creek has three forks, North, Middle and South. All have their headwaters in the eastern Sierra Nevada, near the border with Fresno County. The forks all flow into lakes while still at high elevations. The North Fork flows into North Lake, the Middle Fork flows into Lake Sabrina. The North and Middle forks combine above and flow through the community of Aspendell and below it the combined creeks are dammed at Intake Two, a reservoir. The South Fork flows into South Lake and continues through the community of South Fork (aka Habegger's) and then joins the Middle Fork below  the Intake Two reservoir. Bishop Creek then begins its steep descent to the Owens Valley. The creek runs roughly North then Northeast and then continues East, flowing past the city of Bishop before its confluence with the Owens River.

History 

The creek was named after Owens Valley settler Samuel Addison Bishop.

Hurricane Olivia 

In 1982, a dam burst in the Sierra Madre Mountains, causing 6 inches (152.4 mm) of water to enter into Bishop Creek. Up to 1,400 residents were evacuated from their homes into the nearby town of Bishop, California. Tourists were trapped along the eastern slope of a mountain in the Sierra Nevada range during the storm. An additional 200 people were stranded at Kings Canyon National Park, after a 15-mile (25 km) stretch of California State Route 180 was washed out. A bridge along U.S. Route 395 in Big Pine was damaged. Lodging and businesses along the highway were evacuated due to floods.

See also
Lake Sabrina
Intake Two

References

External links

United States Geological Survey
Mono Basin Clearinghouse

Rivers of Inyo County, California
Rivers of the Sierra Nevada (United States)
Tributaries of the Owens River
Inyo National Forest
Bishop, California
Owens Valley
Rivers of Northern California
Rivers of the Sierra Nevada in California